Shoeybabad may refer to:

Shoeybabad-e Now